Novoostropol is a rural locality (a selo) in Nizhnebuzulinsky Selsoviet of Svobodnensky District, Amur Oblast, Russia. The population is 60 as of 2018.

Geography 
The village is located on the Buzulka River, 38 km north from Svobodny.

References 

Rural localities in Svobodnensky District